Chah Darreh may refer to:
 Chah Darreh, Mashhad, Razavi Khorasan Province
 Chah Darreh, Zanjan